David Taylor Fish FRHA (1824–1901) was a 19th-century botanist and horticultural author.

Life

He was born at Old Scone, Scotland, United Kingdom on 25 September 1824. He was younger brother to Robert Fish (1808–1873), also a gardener and horticulturalist.

Around 1838 he began working at Scone Palace under the head gardener William Beattie then James Syme. He followed in the footsteps of  David Douglas, from whom he would have learnt much and acquired a desire to study plants as well as grow them.

He later worked for Sir T Cullum at Hardwick House, Suffolk as a gardener.

He retired to Edinburgh in 1897. In entries in Edinburgh directories he is listed as "a lecturer".

He died on 22 April 1901 at his home, 12 Fettes Row in Edinburgh  in Edinburgh's New Town. He is buried in Warriston Cemetery in north Edinburgh. The grave is broken but remains wholly legible.

Family
He was married to Lucie Coldworth (d.1928).

He was father to David Sydney Fish (1881–1912) who became a gardener at the Royal Botanic Garden, Edinburgh then to Alexandria in Egypt, where he died. He was an orchid collector and also a horticultural author.

Publications
Cherry and Medlar (1881)
Pear (1881)
Chrysanthemum (1881)
Cassell's Popular Gardening editor 1884-6
The Peach and Nectarine
Bulbs and Bulb Culture (1884)

References

Sources 
 

1824 births
1901 deaths
Scottish botanists
Scottish non-fiction writers